Fusulus is a genus of gastropods belonging to the family Clausiliidae.

The species of this genus are found in Central Europe.

Species:

Fusulus approximans 
Fusulus interruptus

References

Clausiliidae